Panivizhum Malarvanam (English A forest of flowers where dew falls) is a 2014 Indian Tamil thriller film written and directed by James David.  The film stars Abhilash and Sanyathara in the lead roles, while Varsha Ashwathi, Sai Vishal and Jawahar appear in other pivotal roles. The film's music is by music director B. R. Rajin. The film was released on 21 February 2014 to average reviews.

Cast
Abhilash as Tarun
Sanyathara as Kavya
Varsha Ashwathi as Malar 
Sai Vishal as Viju
Ravi Venkatraman as Kavya's father
 Yogi Babu as Tarun's friend
Jawahar

Production
The film was written and directed by newcomer James David, who had previously assisted director Aabhavanan and was an associate director for films such as Nee Venunda Chellam, Rameswaram and the 3D animation movie Inimey Nangathan. The lead actor Abhilash also made his debut in a lead role, having previously portrayed a supporting role in Gautham Vasudev Menon's Neethane En Ponvasantham (2012). The film began shoot in August 2012 and was filmed in locations across Kumily and Thekkady in Kerala. The team also claimed to have selected the tiger which had appeared in Hangover 3 for the venture, while collaborating with the brands Incredible India and Save the Tiger. An audio release function was held in May 2013 with Balu Mahendra and Vairamuthu attending as chief guests.

Release
The film opened on 21 February 2014 to average reviews, with M. Suganth of The Times of India noting "to cut a long story short, while the messages David's film seeks to convey are significant, the manner in which they have been packaged isn't." The New Indian Express noted it was a "fairly engaging thriller", writing that "the narration may seem a tad loosely etched and jumpy at times and has its glitches. But it’s a debutant director’s sincere effort to move away from the beaten path and is refreshingly different."

Music

The film's audio released in May 2013 and the songs have lyrics written by Vairamuthu and Ravi Indrahan. The film's title is taken from a track in Ilaiyaraaja's 1982 musical Ninaivellam Nithya.

References

External links
 

Indian thriller films
2014 films
2010s Tamil-language films
2014 thriller films